Do-ol Ah-in Going All Directions, also known as Do-ol Ah-in Go In All Directions, is a 2019 South Korean culture talk show program on Korean Broadcasting System presented by actor Yoo Ah-in and contemporary Korean philosopher Do-ol Kim Yong-ok. It airs on KBS1 on Saturdays at 20:00 (KST) from 5 January to 23 March 2019 for 12 episodes.

Overview
Do-ol Ah-in Going All Directions is a hybrid of lecture and variety program that reinterprets a hundred years of modern and contemporary history of Korea that transcends the past and future, and communicates through generations and genders.

It was created as a special project to commemorate the 100th anniversary of the establishment of the Provisional Government of the Republic of Korea and the March First Movement. The title "오방간다" (Oh-bang-gan-da) is derived from the Cardinal direction, and refers to 'all directions' and 'joyful and excited state'. The title was created by Yoo Ah-in, and he directly participated in the planning, co-writing and co-directing each episode, including casting the performers.

Format
A new concept of hybrid variety show made by unexpected combination of professor Kim Yong-ok (pen name: Do-ol), actor Yoo Ah-in and folklore singer Lee Hee-moon. Each episode brings different topics related to history, culture, social-politics and current affairs. The talk show takes Korean theatre style and emphasizes impromptu elements or improvisations given by Yoo Ah-in and Do-ol that involves the audience and musicians. The talk show opens with audience survey, then a lecture from Do-ol, follows by Yoo Ah-in's personal stories and experiences, and opinion-sharing with audience. Lee Hee-moon performs Korean folk music in the program's opening and closing.

Cast
Do-ol Kim Yong-ok - Presenter
Yoo Ah-in - Presenter
 Lee Hee-moon - Singer, Obang-shin ('the god of five-directions')
 Prelude - Jazz band

List of Do-ol Ah-in Going All Directions episode

(Ratings: Nielsen Korea provided)

References

South Korean television talk shows
Centennial anniversaries
2019 television specials
Korean Broadcasting System original programming
Korean culture
History of South Korea